The 2013 MTN 8 was the 39th tournament of South Africa's annual football (soccer) cup competition. It featured the top eight teams of the Premier Soccer League table at the end of the 2012-13 season.

Teams
The eight teams that competed in the MTN 8 knockout competition are listed below according to their finishing position in the 2012-13 season.
Kaizer Chiefs
Platinum Stars
Orlando Pirates
Bidvest Wits
Bloemfontein Celtic
Supersport United
Free State Stars
University of Pretoria

Fixtures & Results

Orlando pirates 3 kaizer chief 0
Erasmus
Erasmus
Erasmus

Quarter finals

Semi finals

|}

1st Leg

2nd Leg

Final

Statistics

Top Goal Scorer

External links
Premier Soccer League
South African Football Association

MTN 8
MTN
2013 domestic association football cups